TV, Biwi aur Main is an Indian sitcom series on SAB TV. It premiered on 13 June 2017 and went off air on the 10 of October 2017.

Plot
Rajeev, a television daily-soap producer, is a workaholic, much to his wife's dismay. Hilarity ensues when he tries to strike a balance between his personal and professional life.

Show covers the comic timings created between Priya (Rajeev's wife) and Rajeev's mom who is not satisfied with her son's choice and wanted a daughter-in-law just like Bindiya (Rajeev's show's heroine). She thinks Bindiya is a perfect daughter-in-law as she portrays in the show and compares Priya with Bindiya, though in reality Bindiya is a self-centered arrogant attention seeker. As the time passes Rajeev's mom is shown to have a soft corner for Priya. The show ended with Rajeev receiving a chance to produce one more show in the same channel and he thanks everyone including his team and family for supporting him in his journey.

Cast
Karan Veer Mehra - Rajeev Gupta (TV Producer)
 Shruti Seth - Priya Rajeev Gupta (Rajeev's wife)
 Tanvi Thakkar as Bindiya Bhansali  (Rajeev's TV show's heroine) 
 Karan Godhwani as Kushal (Rajeev's TV show's hero)
 Sudeepa Singh - Bindu (Rajeev's Ex-girlfriend) 
 Khushbu Thakkar as Tanvi (Rajeev's TV show's creative director)
 Ashwin Kaushal as the Director of Rajeev's serial
 Madhuri Sanjeev as Amma Ji 
 Ashok Lokhande as Bau Ji 
Shivangi Verma as Maya (Rajeev's TV show's vamp)
 Akshay Bhagat as Spot Dada
 Sanjay Wadekar as Make-up dada
 Jay Shanker Pandey as DOP(Cameraman) Genius
 Premchand Singh - Rajeev's serial's writer
 Bhavish as A.D. Babloo
 Parveen Kaur (Kushal's Mother in serial)
 Nitin Bhatia as EP
 Hunar Hali as Kamini
 Rajesh Kumar as Jijaji
 Sushmita Mukherjee as Mausi Dadi Ji
 Spandan Chaturvedi as Munni
 Ketki Dave as Priya's Mother
 Twinkle R Vasisht as Neela

Episodes

References

Sony SAB original programming
2017 Indian television series debuts
Indian television sitcoms
Shashi Sumeet Productions series
2017 Indian television series endings
Television series about television